Nickel Plate Road 759 is a class "S-2" 2-8-4 "Berkshire" type steam locomotive built in 1944 by the Lima Locomotive Works in Lima, Ohio as a member of the S-2 class for the New York, Chicago & St. Louis Railroad, commonly referred to as the "Nickel Plate Road". Built as a fast freight locomotive, No. 759 served the Nickel Plate until being retired in 1959 and placed into storage. In 1965, No. 759 was purchased by F. Nelson Blount for display in his Steamtown, U.S.A. collection in North Walpole, New Hampshire. The locomotive was restored to operating condition in 1967 by New York commodity broker Ross Rowland for use in hauling his Golden Spike Centennial Limited, a special commemorative train that celebrated the 100th anniversary of the completion of the Transcontinental Railroad in 1969. Afterwards, No. 759 pulled numerous excursions for Ross Rowland and Steamtown until being retired once more and placed back on display in 1977. As of 2023, the locomotive remains on static display at the Steamtown National Historic Site in Scranton, Pennsylvania, and sibling engine No. 765 continues to operate in mainline excursion service.

History

Revenue service
No. 759 was built in August 1944 by the Lima Locomotive Works in Lima, Ohio for the New York, Chicago & St. Louis Railroad, better known as the "Nickel Plate Road". No. 759 was one of 80 2-8-4 Berkshire type steam locomotives built for the Nickel Plate between 1934 and 1949 for fast freight duties. The Nickel Plate had 4 sub-classes of 2-8-4s corresponding to which order the locomotive was in, these were designated S through S-3, No. 759, is a member of the third order of 2-8-4s, classified S-2.

Much of No. 759's original career on the Nickel Plate is obscure at best, but it is known that in May 1958, No. 759 entered the Nickel Plate's Conneaut, Ohio shops for a complete overhaul which turned out to be the last overhaul of a steam locomotive on the Nickel Plate. After the overhaul was completed, No. 759 was never fired up and instead was put into storage.

Preservation
No. 759 was purchased by steam locomotive enthusiast, F. Nelson Blount on October 16, 1962 and subsequently moved to his Steamtown, U.S.A. collection in North Walpole, New Hampshire. It would later be moved across the Connecticut River to Bellows Falls, Vermont.

Excursion service
In 1967 a commodities broker from New York named Ross E. Rowland made a deal that would return No. 759 to service for steam powered fan trips hosted by Rowland's High Iron Company (HICO). No. 759 was chosen for restoration, since Rowland had previously operated Canadian Pacific 4-6-2 locomotives 1238, 1286, and another one of Blount's locomotives, 1278, and they didn't meet enough expectations to pull his longer excursion trains, unassisted. No. 759 was taken to the Norfolk and Western Railroad's former Nickel Plate roundhouse in Conneaut, Ohio, the same place No. 759 was last serviced. After a short restoration and subsequent testing, No. 759 pulled its first excursion for the High Iron Company on August 30, 1968 when she pulled a 15 car excursion to Buffalo, New York.

In 1969, No. 759 was painted blue and gold for a special train celebrating the 100th anniversary of the driving of the golden spike. This train, dubbed the Golden Spike Centennial Limited, would take No. 759 as far away as Omaha, Nebraska. After returning home from the Golden Spike Centennial Limited, No. 759 was returned to her Nickel Plate Road livery and ran two excursions for Steamtown, one of which was to Scranton, Pennsylvania, Steamtown's future home. In 1970, this engine pulled an "High Iron" excursion from Hoboken to Binghamton, over the Erie Lackawanna main line, stayed over night in Binghamton, and then it returned to Hoboken. In September of that year, No. 759 pulled an excursion on the Western Maryland (WM) mainline between Cumberland and Haegerstown, Maryland.

After a few excursions over the Boston & Maine and Central Vermont in late 1973, No. 759 was placed into storage at the Delaware & Hudson's roundhouse in Rouses Point, New York for the winter. While it was in storage, D&H employees had neglected to completely drain the 759's boiler and left water in it which froze causing a considerable amount of damage to No. 759's boiler tubes. As a result, Steamtown sued the D&H for the damage it caused to the locomotive and won. As settlement for the damage, the D&H had some repairs made to No. 759 and after some follow-up work back at Steamtown, No. 759 was test fired in 1975. In 1977 some more repairs were made to get No.759 legally operational, but after a boiler flue failed during a hydrostatic test, it was decided that No. 759 would remain a static display piece.

No. 759 would join the rest of the Steamtown collection in 1984 when it was moved from Bellows Falls, Vermont to Scranton, Pennsylvania. After the move to Scranton, No. 759 would be placed on display in the former Delaware, Lackawanna & Western rail yard with the rest of the collection. In 1988, Steamtown and most of its collection became part of the newly formed Steamtown National Historic Site.

Disposition

Nickel Plate Road 759 is now a static display at Steamtown, more often than not being on display inside the refurbished DL&W roundhouse. No. 759 is easily seen from the walk way Steamtown put inside the roundhouse to allow visitors to see the work going on. It is also the largest locomotive in the roundhouse with only a foot or two of clearance at either end making it notoriously difficult if not impossible to get a photo of the whole locomotive.

No. 759 was one of the two American built steam locomotives considered by Steamtown to be restored to operating condition, the other being Boston and Maine 3713, which was ultimately chosen over 759, most likely due to clearance issues on the turntable (in order for 759 to fit, all of the safety railings that surround the turntable pit in the areas open to visitors have to be removed).

In 2010, No. 759 was among the several steam locomotives in Steamtown's collection to undergo removal of its asbestos insulation. Asbestos was used by railroads and locomotive manufacturers as boiler insulation. In addition to having the asbestos removed, 759 had all new jacketing (cladding in UK terminology) applied as well as its bell, which had been in storage re-installed.

While it is possible to restore No. 759 to operational condition, Steamtown has stated that they have little interest in restoring 759, citing that it is too large for their use and that another Nickel Plate Road 2-8-4, No. 765, is already operational; the latter has briefly visited Steamtown for Railfest 2015 to pose side by side with 759. For now, No. 759 sits safely on display out of the elements in Steamtown's roundhouse, being one of the three largest non-articulated steam locomotives to be homed at the Steamtown National Historic Site in Scranton, Pennsylvania, the other two being Reading 4-8-4 No. 2124 and Grand Trunk Western 4-8-2 No. 6039.

See also
 Nickel Plate Road
 Nickel Plate Road 763
 Nickel Plate Road 765
 Nickel Plate Road 779

References

Bibliography

External links
Nickel Plate Road Class S-2

2-8-4 locomotives
Nickel Plate Road locomotives
Individual locomotives of the United States
Lima locomotives
Standard gauge locomotives of the United States
Railway locomotives introduced in 1944
Preserved steam locomotives of Pennsylvania